Lisandro Arístides Campos Córdova (born 27 June 1957) is a Mexican politician affiliated with the PRI. He currently serves as Deputy of the LXII Legislature of the Mexican Congress representing Puebla. He also served as Deputy between 2005 and 2006.

References

1957 births
Living people
Institutional Revolutionary Party politicians
21st-century Mexican politicians
Meritorious Autonomous University of Puebla alumni
Deputies of the LXII Legislature of Mexico
Members of the Chamber of Deputies (Mexico) for Puebla